São Pedro do Sul is a municipality in the state of Rio Grande do Sul, Brazil.

Paleontology 

The Museum Paleontologic and Archaeological Walter Ilha has fossils.

See also
List of municipalities in Rio Grande do Sul

References

Municipalities in Rio Grande do Sul